Lucius Aemilius Paullus may refer to:

 Lucius Aemilius Paullus (consul 219 BC)
 Lucius Aemilius Paullus Macedonicus
 Lucius Aemilius Paullus (consul 50 BC)
 Lucius Aemilius Paullus (consul 1)

See also
 Aemilius Paullus